The 2002 DFB-Ligapokal Final decided the winner of the 2002 DFB-Ligapokal, the 6th edition of the reiterated DFB-Ligapokal, a knockout football cup competition.

The match was played on 1 August 2002 at the Ruhrstadion in Bochum. Hertha BSC won the match 4–1 against Schalke 04, an exact repeat of the previous final, for their 2nd title.

Teams

Route to the final
The DFB-Ligapokal is a six team single-elimination knockout cup competition. There are a total of two rounds leading up to the final. Four teams enter the preliminary round, with the two winners advancing to the semi-finals, where they will be joined by two additional clubs who were given a bye. For all matches, the winner after 90 minutes advances. If still tied, extra time, and if necessary penalties are used to determine the winner.

Match

Details

References

2002
FC Schalke 04 matches
Hertha BSC matches
2002–03 in German football cups
Sports competitions in North Rhine-Westphalia
2000s in North Rhine-Westphalia